"Better Now"  is a song by Swedish singer Måns Zelmerlöw. The song was released as a digital download on 17 May 2019 through Warner Music Group as the second single from his eighth studio album Time. The song peaked at number 79 on the Swedish Singles Chart. The song was written by Måns Zelmerlöw, Emma Rohan, Peter Mark Hammerton and Tom Mann.

Background
The song is about Zelmerlöw's dark past and it details how he fought to become a better person. The song is like a window to his soul. He wrote the song about his son Albert. Lyrically, he comes out as someone who is trying to be a good and non-judgemental father, "Don't grow up to be me, grow up to be you". He is undoubtedly encouraging his baby boy to become one of the heroes of his own time.

Music video
A music video to accompany the release of "Better Now" was first released onto YouTube on 14 June 2019 at a total length of three minutes and ten seconds.

Track listing

Charts

Release history

References

2019 songs
2019 singles
Måns Zelmerlöw songs
Songs written by Måns Zelmerlöw
Songs written by Emma Rohan